The Jonathan Brooks House is a historic house at 2 Woburn Street in Medford, Massachusetts, United States.  The house is estimated to have been built in the 1780s (the property is only described as including a house in 1791), although it may incorporate  elements of an older structure.  Jonathan Brooks, its owner in 1791, was a tanner and a member of the locally prominent Brooks family which owned much of West Medford at the time.  The house is one of a small number of 18th century gambrel-roofed houses to survive in the city.

The house was listed on the National Register of Historic Places in 1975.

See also
National Register of Historic Places listings in Medford, Massachusetts
National Register of Historic Places listings in Middlesex County, Massachusetts

References

Houses on the National Register of Historic Places in Medford, Massachusetts
Houses in Medford, Massachusetts